Blazing Saddles is a 1974 American satirical western black comedy film directed by Mel Brooks, who co-wrote the screenplay with Andrew Bergman, Richard Pryor, Norman Steinberg and Alan Uger, based on a story treatment by Bergman. The film stars Cleavon Little and Gene Wilder. The film received generally positive reviews from critics and audiences, was nominated for three Academy Awards and is ranked No. 6 on the American Film Institute's 100 Years...100 Laughs list.

Brooks appears in three supporting roles: Governor William J. Le Petomane, a Yiddish-speaking Native American chief, and "a aviator/director" in line to help invade Rock Ridge (a nod to Hitchcock); he also dubs lines for one of Lili Von Shtupp's backing troupe and a cranky moviegoer. The supporting cast includes Slim Pickens, Alex Karras and David Huddleston, as well as Brooks regulars Dom DeLuise, Madeline Kahn and Harvey Korman. Bandleader Count Basie has a cameo as himself, appearing with his orchestra.

The film is full of deliberate anachronisms, from the Count Basie Orchestra playing "April in Paris" in the Wild West, to Pickens' character mentioning the Wide World of Sports.

In 2006, Blazing Saddles was deemed "culturally, historically, or aesthetically significant" by the Library of Congress and was selected for preservation in the National Film Registry.

Plot 
On the American frontier of 1874, a new railroad under construction will have to be rerouted through the town of Rock Ridge in order to avoid quicksand. Realizing this will make Rock Ridge worth millions, territorial attorney general Hedley Lamarr plans to force Rock Ridge's residents out of the town and sends a gang of thugs, led by his flunky Taggart, to shoot the sheriff and trash the town. 

The townspeople demand that Governor William J. Le Petomane appoint a new sheriff to protect them. Lamarr persuades dim-witted Le Petomane to appoint Bart, a  black railroad worker about to be executed for assaulting Taggart. A Black sheriff, Lamarr reasons, will offend the townspeople, create chaos, and leave Rock Ridge at his mercy.

After an initial hostile reception (Bart takes himself "hostage" to escape), he relies on his quick wits and the assistance of Jim, an alcoholic gunslinger known as the "Waco Kid", to overcome the townspeople's hostility. Bart subdues Mongo, an immensely strong and dim-witted yet philosophical henchman sent to kill him, then outwits German seductress-for-hire Lili Von Shtupp at her own game, with Lili falling in love with him. 

Upon release, Mongo vaguely informs Bart of Lamarr's connection to the railroad, so Bart and Jim visit the railroad worksite and discover from Bart's best friend Charlie that the railway is planned to go through Rock Ridge. Taggart and his men arrive to kill Bart, but Jim outshoots them and forces their retreat. Lamarr, furious that his schemes have backfired, recruits an army of thugs, including common criminals, motorcycle gangsters, Ku Klux Klansmen, Nazis and Methodists.

East of Rock Ridge, Bart introduces the white townspeople to the Black, Chinese and Irish railroad workers who have all agreed to help them in exchange for acceptance by the community, and explains his plan to defeat Lamarr's army. They labor all night to build a perfect copy of the town as a diversion. When Bart realizes it will not fool the villains, the townsfolk construct copies of themselves.

Bart, Jim and Mongo buy time by constructing the "Gov. William J. Le Petomane Thruway", forcing the raiding party to send for change to pay the toll. Once through the tollbooth, the raiders attack the fake town and its population of dummies, which have been booby-trapped with dynamite. After Jim detonates the bombs with his sharpshooting, launching bad guys and horses skyward, the Rock Ridgers attack the villains.

The resulting brawl between townsfolk, railroad workers, and Lamarr's thugs literally breaks the fourth wall and bursts onto a neighboring movie set where director Buddy Bizarre is filming a Busby Berkeley-style top-hat-and-tails musical number; into the studio commissary for a food fight; and spilling out of the Warner Bros. film lot onto the streets of Burbank. 

Lamarr, realizing he has been beaten, hails a taxi and orders the cabbie to "drive me off this picture". He ducks into Mann's Chinese Theatre, which is showing the premiere of Blazing Saddles. As he settles into his seat, he sees onscreen Bart arriving on horseback outside the theatre. Bart blocks Lamarr's escape and shoots him in the groin. Bart and Jim then enter the theater to watch the end of the film, in which Bart announces to the townspeople that he is moving on because his work is done (and because he is bored). 

Riding out of town, he finds Jim, still eating his popcorn, and invites him along to "nowhere special". The two friends briefly ride into the desert before dismounting and boarding a limousine, which drives off into the sunset.

Cast 

Cast notes:
 Count Basie and his orchestra make a cameo, playing "April in Paris" in the middle of the desert as Bart rides toward Rock Ridge to assume the post of sheriff.
 Brooks appears in three on-screen roles: Governor William J. Le Petomane, the Yiddish-speaking Native American chief (appearing in redface) in Bart's backstory, and an applicant for Hedley Lamarr's thug army (an aviator wearing sunglasses and a flight jacket). He also has two off-screen voice roles, as one of Lili's German chorus boys during "I'm Tired", and as a grouchy moviegoer. 
 "Le Petomane" refers to Joseph Pujol, a performer in 19th-century France who was a professional flatulist using "Le Pétomane" as his stage name.
 Carol Arthur (Harriet Johnson) was DeLuise's wife.
 "Olson Johnson" is a reference to the vaudeville comedy team Olsen and Johnson, "Howard Johnson" to the defunct Howard Johnson's restaurant chain, "Van Johnson" to the actor Van Johnson, and "Dr. Samuel Johnson" to the 18th-century English writer by that name. The character of "Gabby Johnson" is a direct parody of cowboy actor Gabby Hayes.

Production

Development 
The idea came from a story outline written by Andrew Bergman that he originally intended to develop and produce himself. "I wrote a first draft called Tex-X" (a play on Malcolm X's name), he said. "Alan Arkin was hired to direct and James Earl Jones was going to play the sheriff. That fell apart, as things often do." Brooks was taken with the story, which he described as "hip talk—1974 talk and expressions—happening in 1874 in the Old West", and purchased the film rights from Bergman. Though he had not worked with a writing team since Your Show of Shows, he hired a group of writers (including Bergman) to expand the outline, and posted a large sign: "Please do not write a polite script."

Brooks described the writing process as chaotic: "Blazing Saddles was more or less written in the middle of a drunken fistfight. There were five of us all yelling loudly for our ideas to be put into the movie. Not only was I the loudest, but luckily I also had the right as director to decide what was in or out." Bergman remembers the room being just as chaotic, telling Creative Screenwriting, "In the beginning, we had five people. One guy left after a couple of weeks. Then, it was basically me, Mel, Richie Pryor and Norman Steinberg. Richie left after the first draft and then Norman, Mel and I wrote the next three or four drafts. It was a riot. It was a rioter’s room!"

Title 
The original title, Tex X, was rejected to avoid it being mistaken for an X-rated film, as were Black Bart – a reference to Black Bart, a white highwayman of the 19th century – and Purple Sage. Brooks said he finally conceived Blazing Saddles one morning while taking a shower.

Casting 
The casting was problematic. Pryor was Brooks' original choice to play Sheriff Bart, but the studio, claiming his history of drug arrests made him uninsurable, refused to approve financing with Pryor as the star. The role of Sheriff Bart went to Cleavon Little, and Pryor remained as a screenwriter instead. Brooks offered the other leading role, the Waco Kid, to John Wayne; he declined, deeming the film "too blue" for his family-oriented image, but assured Brooks that "he would be the first one in line to see it." Gig Young was cast, but he collapsed during his first scene from what was later determined to be alcohol withdrawal syndrome, and Wilder was flown in to replace him.

Johnny Carson and Wilder both turned down the Hedley Lamarr role before Korman was cast. Madeline Kahn objected when Brooks asked to see her legs during her audition. "She said, 'So it's THAT kind of an audition? Brooks recalled. "I explained that I was a happily married man and that I needed someone who could straddle a chair with her legs like Marlene Dietrich in Destry Rides Again. So she lifted her skirt and said, 'No touching.

Filming 
Principal photography began on March 6, 1973, and wrapped in early May 1973. Brooks had numerous conflicts over content with Warner Bros. executives, including frequent use of the word "nigger", Lili Von Shtupp's seduction scene, the cacophony of flatulence around the campfire, and Mongo punching out a horse. Brooks, whose contract gave him final content control, declined to make any substantive changes, with the exception of cutting Bart's final line during Lili's seduction: "I hate to disappoint you, ma'am, but you're sucking my arm." When asked later about the many "nigger" references, Brooks said he received consistent support from Pryor and Little. He added, "If they did a remake of Blazing Saddles today [2012], they would leave out the N-word. And then, you've got no movie." Brooks said he received many letters of complaint after the film's release.

Music 
Brooks wrote the music and lyrics for three of Blazing Saddles songs, "The Ballad of Rock Ridge", "I'm Tired" and "The French Mistake". Brooks also wrote the lyrics to the title song, with music by composer John Morris. To sing the title song, Brooks advertised in the trade papers for a "Frankie Laine–type" singer; to his surprise, Laine himself offered his services. "Frankie sang his heart out ... and we didn't have the heart to tell him it was a spoof. He never heard the whip cracks; we put those in later. We got so lucky with his serious interpretation of the song."

The choreographer for "I'm Tired" and "The French Mistake" was Alan Johnson. "I'm Tired" is a homage to and parody of Marlene Dietrich's performance of Cole Porter's song "I'm the Laziest Gal in Town" in Alfred Hitchcock's 1950 film Stage Fright, as well as "Falling in Love Again (Can't Help It)" from The Blue Angel.

The orchestrations were by Morris and Jonathan Tunick.

Lawsuit 
During production, retired longtime film star Hedy Lamarr sued Warner Bros. for $100,000, charging that the film's running parody of her name infringed on her right to privacy. Brooks said that he was flattered and chose to not fight it in court; the studio settled out of court for a small sum and an apology for "almost using her name." Brooks said that Lamarr "never got the joke." This lawsuit would be referenced by an in-film joke where Brooks' character, the Governor, tells Lamarr that "This is 1874; you'll be able to sue HER."

Release 
The film was almost unreleased. "When we screened it for executives, there were few laughs," said Brooks. "The head of distribution said, 'Let's dump it and take a loss.' But [studio president John] Calley insisted they open it in New York, Los Angeles and Chicago as a test. It became the studio's top moneymaker that summer."

The world premiere took place on February 7, 1974, at the Pickwick Drive-In Theater in Burbank; 250 invited guests—including Little and Wilder—watched the film on horseback.

Response 
While Blazing Saddles is now considered a classic, critical reaction was mixed upon initial release. Vincent Canby wrote:

Roger Ebert gave the film four stars out of four, calling it a "crazed grab bag of a movie that does everything to keep us laughing except hit us over the head with a rubber chicken. Mostly, it succeeds. It's an audience picture; it doesn't have a lot of classy polish and its structure is a total mess. But of course! What does that matter while Alex Karras is knocking a horse cold with a right cross to the jaw?" Gene Siskel awarded three stars out of four and called it "bound to rank with the funniest of the year," adding, "Whenever the laughs begin to run dry, Brooks and his quartet of gag writers splash about in a pool of obscenities that score belly laughs if your ears aren't sensitive and if you're hip to western movie conventions being parodied." Variety wrote, "If comedies are measured solely by the number of yocks they generate from audiences, then 'Blazing Saddles' must be counted a success ... Few viewers will have time between laughs to complain that pic is essentially a raunchy, protracted version of a television comedy skit."

Charles Champlin of the Los Angeles Times called the film "irreverent, outrageous, improbable, often as blithely tasteless as a stag night at the Friar's Club and almost continuously funny." Gary Arnold of The Washington Post was negative, writing that "Mel Brooks squanders a snappy title on a stockpile of stale jokes. To say that this slapdash Western spoof lacks freshness and spontaneity and originality is putting it mildly. 'Blazing Saddles' is at once a messy and antiquated gag machine." Jan Dawson of The Monthly Film Bulletin wrote, "Perhaps it is pedantic to complain that the whole is not up to the sum of its parts when, for the curate's egg that it is, Blazing Saddles contains so many good parts and memorable performances." John Simon wrote a negative review of Blazing Saddles, saying, "All kinds of gags—chiefly anachronisms, irrelevancies, reverse ethnic jokes, and out and out vulgarities—are thrown together pell-mell, batted about insanely in all directions, and usually beaten into the ground."

On review aggregator Rotten Tomatoes, the film has an 89% approval rating based on 65 reviews, with an average rating of 8.20/10. The site's consensus reads: "Daring, provocative, and laugh-out-loud funny, Blazing Saddles is a gleefully vulgar spoof of Westerns that marks a high point in Mel Brooks' storied career." On Metacritic it has a score of 73% based on reviews from 12 critics, indicating "generally favorable reviews".

Ishmael Reed's 1969 novel Yellow Back Radio Broke-Down has been cited as an important precursor or influence for Blazing Saddles, a connection that Reed himself has made.

Box office 
The film earned theatrical rentals of $26.7 million in its initial release in the United States and Canada. In its 1976 reissue, it earned a further $10.5 million and another $8 million in 1979. Its total rentals in the United States and Canada totalled $47.8 million from a gross of $119.5 million, becoming only the tenth film up to that time to pass the $100 million mark.

Awards and accolades 
While addressing his group of bad guys, Harvey Korman's character reminds them that, although they are risking their lives, he is "risking an almost certain Academy Award nomination for Best Supporting Actor!" Korman did not receive an Oscar bid, but the film did get three nominations at the 47th Academy Awards, including Best Supporting Actress for Madeline Kahn.

In 2006, Blazing Saddles was deemed "culturally, historically, or aesthetically significant" by the Library of Congress and was selected for preservation in the National Film Registry.

Upon the release of the 30th anniversary special edition in 2004, Today said that the movie "skewer[ed] just about every aspect of racial prejudice while keeping the laughs coming" and that it was "at the top of a very short list" of comedies still funny after 30 years. In 2014, NPR wrote that four decades after the movie was made it was "still as biting a satire" on racism as ever, although its treatment of gays and women was "not self-aware at all".

The film is recognized by American Film Institute in these lists:
 2000: AFI's 100 Years...100 Laughs – No. 6

Adaptations

TV series 
A television pilot titled Black Bart was produced for CBS based on Bergman's original story. It featured Louis Gossett Jr. as Bart and Steve Landesberg as his drunkard sidekick, a former Confederate officer named "Reb Jordan". Other cast members included Millie Slavin and Noble Willingham. Bergman is listed as the sole creator. CBS aired the pilot once on April 4, 1975. The pilot episode of Black Bart was later included as a bonus feature on the Blazing Saddles 30th Anniversary DVD and the Blu-ray disc.

Possible stage production 
In September 2017, Brooks indicated his desire to do a stage version of Blazing Saddles in the future.

In popular culture 
The Rock Ridge standard for CD and DVD media is named after the town in Blazing Saddles.

The 2022 animated film Paws of Fury: The Legend of Hank, starring Michael Cera, Samuel L. Jackson, Michelle Yeoh and Ricky Gervais, was originally titled Blazing Samurai and its creators called it  "equally inspired by and an homage to Blazing Saddles." Brooks served as an executive producer for the production, and voiced one of the characters.

Home media 
The film was first released on DVD in 1997, followed by a 30th Anniversary Special Edition DVD in 2004 and a Blu-ray version in 2006. A 40th anniversary Blu-ray set was released in 2014.

References

External links 

 
 Blazing Saddles essay by Michael Schlesinger at National Film Registry. 
 
 
 
 
 

1974 films
1974 comedy films
1974 Western (genre) films
1970s American films
1970s black comedy films
1970s English-language films
1970s parody films
1970s satirical films
1970s Western (genre) comedy films
African-American Western (genre) films
American Western (genre) comedy films
American black comedy films
American parody films
American satirical films
Ethnic humour
Films about racism in the United States
Films directed by Mel Brooks
Films scored by John Morris
Films set in 1856
Films set in 1874
Films set in a movie theatre
Films shot in California
Films with screenplays by Andrew Bergman
Films with screenplays by Mel Brooks
Films with screenplays by Richard Pryor
Films with screenplays by Norman Steinberg
Films with screenplays by Alan Uger
Self-reflexive films
United States National Film Registry films
Warner Bros. films